Big Time Attic is a Limited Liability Corporation. It is the operational name of Twin Cities comic artists Zander Cannon and Kevin Cannon (no relation). It was founded in August 2004, between the Cannons and Shadi Petosky.

History

The beginning

Big Time Attic, LLC started in the attic of Shadi Petosky's home in Minneapolis, with the intention of doing graphic design work to fund pet comic projects. Zander Cannon began as the primary illustrator on projects, with Kevin Cannon as colorist. They credited themselves "Big Time Attic" on their first comic book together, a square-formatted educational pamphlet for USGS. This comic, entitled Journey along a field line is notable for being the first comic book listed as a scientific paper on the USGS site.

Their first graphic novel was Bone Sharps, Cowboys, and Thunder Lizards, commissioned and written by GT-labs. After taking on a few interns from MCAD's Comic Department, the company decided they wanted to try having employees and expand into other areas. To meet these requirements, the company moved in 2005 from Shadi Petosky's home to the Thorp Building in the arts quadrant of Nordeast Minneapolis.

Publications
Journey Along a Field Line with J.J. Love (2006)
Bone Sharps, Cowboys, and Thunder Lizards with Jim Ottaviani (2006)
T-Minus: The Race to the Moon with Jim Ottaviani (2009)
The Stuff of Life: A Graphic Guide to Genetics and DNA with Mark Schultz (2009)

References

External links
 Journey Along a Field Line digital comic book from USGS site
 Big Time Attic's Home Page
 Home of Jim Ottaviani's GT-Labs

2004 establishments in Minnesota
Companies based in Minneapolis
American companies established in 2004
Publishing companies established in 2004